The Hamilton Place Historic District is a  historic district in St. Louis, Missouri that was listed on the National Register of Historic Places in 2005.  It includes 160 contributing buildings, including along the 5900-6000 blocks of Enright, Cates, and Clemens.  It includes Late Victorian architecture and Late 19th and 20th Century Revivals architecture, and it includes work by architects Barnett, Haynes & Barnett.

The district included 160 contributing resources and 13 non-contributing buildings on portions of six city blocks near the western edge of St. Louis.  It included 105 single-family residences, 12 apartment buildings or tenements, 11 two- or four-family flats, 31 garages/stables, and one non-residential building, an auto repair shop.

References

Victorian architecture in Missouri
Historic districts on the National Register of Historic Places in Missouri
National Register of Historic Places in St. Louis